Santa Maria dell'Angelo, also known as Santa Maria Nuova is a Baroque architecture, Roman Catholic church, erected by the Jesuit Order on Via Santa Maria dell'Angelo in Faenza, Italy. 

Construction began in 1621, and the cupola was finally erected in 1646, when the original architect Girolamo Rainaldi was substituted by Ercole Fichi. The facade remains incomplete. The main altarpiece, placed here in 1778, painted in a Renaissance style, was by an unknown artist, but attributed by some to Sigismondo Foschi.

References

 Maria dell'Angelo
17th-century Roman Catholic church buildings in Italy
Baroque architecture in Faenza
1621 establishments in Italy
Roman Catholic churches completed in 1646